The Provincial Assembly of South Kivu is the provincial assembly of South Kivu province, Democratic Republic of the Congo. It consists of 35 popularly elected members, and has the power to vote for the governor; it can also vote to impeach or suspend the governor. The speaker is currently the Hon. Emile Baleke Kadudu.
 
Provincial legislatures of the Democratic Republic of the Congo
South Kivu